"See Wat I'm Sayin" is a song by American rapper Moneybagg Yo, released on May 27, 2022. It was produced by Tay Keith and DrumGod.

Composition
In the song, Moneybagg Yo details him keeping women by his side, gives warnings to the opposition and questions why he would be taken as a joke, over a beat with a heavy bass.

Music video
The music video was released alongside the single. It shows Moneybagg Yo "making his way through multiple women".

Charts

References

2022 singles
2022 songs
Moneybagg Yo songs
Songs written by Tay Keith
Song recordings produced by Tay Keith